This is a list of file synchronization software for which there are Wikipedia articles.

Free and open-source

Freeware
This is a comparison of the freeware (proprietary software release free of charge) file synchronization software.

Commercial
This is a comparison of commercial software in the field of file synchronization. These programs only provide full functionality with a payment. As indicated, some are trialware and provide functionality during a trial period; some are freemium, meaning that they have freeware editions.

Glossary

See also

References

Further reading
 
 

 
Storage software
File synchronization software